Kaya is the tenth studio album released by Bob Marley and the Wailers in 1978. The album consists of tracks recorded alongside those present on the Exodus album in 1977.

The album has a very relaxed, laid back sound, lacking much of the militant quality of the Wailers lyrically and musically. They received criticism for 'going soft' as a result of the general sound of the album as well as the theme: songs primarily revolving around love, as well as marijuana.

The album's release coincided with the One Love Peace Concert, heralding Marley's triumphant return to Jamaica from exodus in London. Three of the songs are new versions of tracks from the 1971 album Soul Revolution Part II. Well-known songs from the album include "Is This Love" and "Satisfy My Soul". Kaya reached the top five in the UK album charts.

Track listing

Original album (1978)
All songs written by Bob Marley. Mastered by Ted Jensen of Sterling Sound.

The Definitive Remasters edition (2001)
All songs written by Bob Marley.

Deluxe edition (2013)

Musicians

Bob Marley – lead vocals, rhythm guitar, acoustic guitar, percussion
Aston "Family Man" Barrett – bass, percussion
Carlton Barrett – drums, percussion
Tyrone "Organ D" Downie – keyboards, percussion
Alvin "Seeco" Patterson – percussion
Junior Marvin – lead guitar
Rita Marley – backing vocals
Marcia Griffiths – backing vocals
Judy Mowatt – backing vocals
Vincent Gordon – trombone
Glen Da Costa – trumpet
Winston Grennan – drums

Charts

Weekly charts

Year-end charts

Certifications

References 

Bob Marley and the Wailers albums
1978 albums
Island Records albums
Tuff Gong albums